Rocky Neck may refer to:

 Rocky Neck, Gloucester, Massachusetts, art colony, peninsula and park
 Rocky Neck State Park, Connecticut